Annamalai Nagar is a special grade  Panchayat town in Cuddalore district  in the state of Tamil Nadu, India. 
The town is named after Annamalai Chettiar, an Indian businessperson, educationist and philanthropist. The Annamalai University, founded by him, is located in Annamalai Nagar.

Chidambaram is the nearest train station and bus terminus.

Demographics

 India census, Annamalai Nagar had a population of 16289 of which 8646 are males and 7643 are females. Literacy rate of Annamalai Nagar city is 95.22 %, higher than state average of 80.09%, In Annamalai Nagar, Male literacy is around 97.53 % while female literacy rate is 92.59 %. Panchayat has total administration over 2,445 houses to which it supplies basic amenities like water and sewerage.

References

Cities and towns in Cuddalore district